Wang Fei may refer to:

Faye Wong (born 1969), Chinese pop singer and actress

Association football
 Wang Fei (footballer, born 1989), Chinese men's footballer
 Wang Fei (female footballer) (born 1990), Chinese women's football goalkeeper
 Wang Fei (footballer, born 1993), Chinese men's footballer

Other sportspeople
 Wang Fei (basketball) (born 1963), Chinese basketball player and coach
 Wang Fei (beach volleyball) (born 1981), Chinese beach volleyball player
 Wang Fei (speed skater) (born 1982), Chinese speed skater
 Wang Fei (cyclist) (born 1987), Chinese road cyclist
 Wang Fei (rower)

See also
 Faye Wong (disambiguation)
 Consort Wang (disambiguation)